This list contains names of ideological systems, movements and trends named after persons. The stem may be either a person's real name or a nickname. Some of the eponyms are given by people adhering to the movements mentioned, others by outsiders.

Social and political
 Ambedkarism, after B. R. Ambedkar
 Artiguism, after José Gervasio Artigas
 Assadism, after Hafez al-Assad
 Bevanism, after Aneurin Bevan
 Bidenism, after Joe Biden
 Bismarckism, after Otto von Bismarck
 Blairism, after Tony Blair
 Blanquism, after Louis Auguste Blanqui
 Bolivarianism, after Simón Bolívar
 Bonapartism, after Napoleon Bonaparte
 Brezhnevism, after Leonid Brezhnev
 Buharism, after Muhammadu Buhari
 Bushism, after George W. Bush
 Caesarism, after Julius Caesar
 Cameronism, after David Cameron
 Canovismo, after Antonio Cánovas del Castillo
 Cardenism, after Lázaro Cárdenas
 Carlism, after Infante Carlos, Count of Molina
 Carlotism, after Carlota Joaquina of Spain
 Castroism, after Fidel and Raúl Castro
 Chavismo, after Hugo Chávez
 Ceausism, after Nicolae Ceausescu
 Chiracism, after Jacques Chirac
 Clintonism, after Bill and Hillary Clinton
 Cobdenism, after Richard Cobden
 Colbertism, after Jean-Baptiste Colbert
 Corbynism, after Jeremy Corbyn
 Craxism, after Bettino Craxi
 De Leonism, after Daniel De Leon
 Deng Xiaoping Theory, after Deng Xiaoping
 Đilasism, after Milovan Đilas
 Engelsism, after Friedrich Engels
 Erdoğanism, after Recep Tayyip Erdoğan
 Evoism, after Evo Morales
 Fabianism, after Quintus Fabius Maximus Verrucosus
 Fortuynism, after Pim Fortuyn
 Fourierism, after Charles Fourier
 Francoism, after Francisco Franco
 Fujimorism after Alberto Fujimori
 Gaddafism, after Muammar Gaddafi
 Gaitskellism, after Hugh Gaitskell
 Gladstonian Liberalism, after William Ewart Gladstone
 Gandhism, after Mahatma Gandhi
 Garveyism, after Marcus Garvey
 Gaullism, after Charles de Gaulle
 Gruevskism, after Nikola Gruevski
 Guevarism, after Che Guevara
 Haiderism, after Jörg Haider
 Hansonism, after Pauline Hanson
 Hitlerism (best known as Nazism), after Adolf Hitler 
 Ho Chi Minh Thought, after Ho Chi Minh
 Hoxhaism, after Enver Hoxha
 Husakism, after Gustáv Husák
 Jacksonian democracy, after Andrew Jackson
 Jacobitism, after James II of England
 Jeffersonian democracy, after Thomas Jefferson
 Josephinism, after Joseph II, Holy Roman Emperor
 Kádárism, after János Kádár
 Kahanism, after Meir Kahane
 Katterism, after Bob Katter
 Kemalism, after Mustafa Kemal Atatürk
 Khomeinism, after Ruhollah Khomeini
 Khrushchevism, after Nikita Khrushchev
Kimilsungism, after Kim Il-sung
Kimilsungism-Kimjongilism, after Kim Il-sung and Kim Jong-il
 Kirchnerism, after Néstor and Cristina Fernández de Kirchner
 Kurzism, after Sebastian Kurz
 Langism, after Jack Lang
 Lassallism, after Ferdinand Lassalle
 Leninism, after Vladimir Lenin
 Longism, after Huey Long
 Lulism, after Luiz Inácio Lula da Silva and Dilma Rousseff
 Lumumbism, after Patrice Lumumba
 Luxemburgism, after Rosa Luxemburg
 Machiavellism, after Niccolò Machiavelli
 Maduroism, after Nicolás Maduro
 Magonism, after Ricardo Flores Magón
 Makhnovism, after Nestor Makhno
 Marhaenism, after Sukarno
 Maoism, after Mao Zedong
 Marxism, after Karl Marx
Maxtonism, after Graeme Maxton 
 McCarthyism, after Joseph McCarthy
 Metaxism, after Ioannis Metaxas
 Mobutism, after Mobutu Sese Seko
 Möllemannism, after Jürgen Möllemann
 Mussolinism, after Benito Mussolini
 Nasserism, after Gamal Abdel Nasser
 Nehruism, after Jawaharlal Nehru
 Obamaism, after Barack Obama
 Orbanism after Viktor Orban
 Owenism, after Robert Owen
 Peronism, after Juan, Eva, and Isabel Perón
 Pinochetism, after Augusto Pinochet
 Prachanda Path, after Prachanda
 Poujadism, after Pierre Poujade
 Powellism, after Enoch Powell
 Putinism after Vladimir Putin
 Rankovićism, after Aleksandar Ranković
 Saddamism, after Saddam Hussein
 Sandinismo, after Augusto César Sandino
 Sankarism, after Thomas Sankara
 Schumerism, after Chuck Schumer
 Shachtmanism, after Max Shachtman
 Stalinism, after Joseph Stalin
 Sternism, after Avraham Stern
 Strasserism, after Gregor and Otto Strasser
 Thatcherism, after Margaret Thatcher
 Titoism, after Josip Broz Tito
 Trotskyism, after Leon Trotsky
 Trudeauism, after Pierre Trudeau
 Trumpism, after Donald Trump
 Tudjmanism, after Franjo Tuđman
 Uribism, after Álvaro Uribe
 Venizelism, after Eleftherios Venizelos
 Wäisi movement, after Bahawetdin Wäisev
 Wilhelminism, after Wilhelm II
 Wilsonianism, after Woodrow Wilson
 Xi Jinping Thought, after Xi Jinping
 Yeltsinism, after Boris Yeltsin

Religious and philosophical
 Acacian schism, after Acacius of Constantinople
 Ahmadiyya, after Ahmad, other name of Muhammad
 Alevi, after Ali
 Althusserian, after Louis Althusser
 Amish, after Jakob Ammann
 Apollinarism, after Apollinaris of Laodicea
 Arianism, after Christian theologian Arius
 Aristotelianism, after Aristotle
 Arminianism, after Jacobus Arminius
 Augustinism, after Augustine of Hippo
 Averroism, after Averroes
 Bábism, after Siyyid `Alí Muḥammad Shírází or the Báb
 Badawiyyah, after Ahmad al-Badawi
 Baháʼí Faith, after Bahá'u'lláh
 Basilideans, after Basilides
 Bektashi, after Haji Bektash Veli
 Benthamism, after Jeremy Bentham
 Buchmanism, after Frank N. D. Buchman
 Buddhism, after Buddha
 Calvinism, after John Calvin
 Cartesian dualism, after René Descartes
 Christianity, after Jesus Christ
 Confucianism, after Confucius
 Darqawa, after Muhammad al-Arabi al-Darqawi
 Dominican , after Saint Dominic
 Druze, after Ad-Darazi
 Epicureanism, after Epicurus
 Erastianism, after Thomas Erastus
 Eutychianism, after Eutyches
 Febronianism, after Justinus Febronius
 Franciscan Christianity, after Francis of Assisi
 Frankism, after Jacob Frank
 Feeneyism, after Leonard Feeney
 Foucauldianism, after Michel Foucault
 Gelasian doctrine, after Pope Gelasius I
 Georgism, after Henry George
 Gregorian Reform, after Pope Gregory VII
 Gülen movement, after Fethullah Gülen
 Halveti, after Pir Umar Halveti
 Hanafi, after Abū Ḥanīfa
 Hegelianism, after Georg Wilhelm Friedrich Hegel
 Hobbesianism, after Thomas Hobbes
 Hussites, after Jan Hus
 Hutterite, after Jakob Hutter
 Ismailism, after Isma'il ibn Jafar
 Jansenism, after Cornelius Jansen
 Jerrahi, after Muhammad Nureddin al-Jerrahi
 Jesuism (best known as Christianity), after Jesus
 Kantianism, after Immanuel Kant
 Kubrawiya, after Najmuddin Kubra
 Laestadianism, after Lars Levi Læstadius
 Luddites, after Ned Ludd
 Lutheranism and Neo-Lutheranism, after Church reformer Martin Luther
 Manichaeism or Manicheism, after Mani (prophet)
 Marcionism, after Marcion of Sinope
 Marcosians, after Marcus
 Martinism, after Louis Claude de Saint-Martin
 Mazdakism, after Mazdak
 Mennonite, after Menno Simons
 Millerism or Millerite, after William Miller (preacher)
 Mohism, after Mozi
 Montanism, after Montanus
 Muhammadism, after Muhammad
 Naqshbandi, after Baha-ud-Din Naqshband Bukhari
 Nestorianism, after Nestorius
 Nimatullahi, after Shah Ni'matullah Wali
 Novatianism, after Novatian
 Panglossianism, after "Dr. Pangloss", a character in Voltaire's "Candide"
 Paulicianism, after Paul of Samosata
 Pelagianism, after Pelagius
 Platonism and Neo-Platonism, after Plato
 Priscillianism, after Priscillian
 Puseyism, after Edward Bouverie Pusey
 Pyrrhonism, after Pyrrho
 Pythagoreanism, after Pythagoras
 Qadiriyyah, after Abdul-Qadir Gilani
 Qutbism, after Sayyid Qutb
 Randianism, after Ayn Rand
 Rastafari movement, after Ras Tafari
 Raëlism, after Claude Vorilhon or Raël
 Rifaiyyah, after Ahmed ar-Rifa'i
 Sabellianism, after Sabellius
 Safaviyeh, after Safi-ad-din Ardabili
 Saint-Simonianism after Henri de Saint-Simon
 Senussi, after Muhammad ibn Ali as-Senussi
 Shadhili, after Abul Hasan al-Shadhili
 Socinianism, after Lelio Sozzini
 Spinozism, after Baruch Spinoza
 Sri Aurobindo Ashram, after Sri Aurobindo
 Suhrawardiyya, after Abu al-Najib al-Suhrawardi
 Thomism, after Thomas Aquinas
 Tijaniyyah, after Ahmad al-Tijani
 Tolstoyism, after Leo Tolstoy
 Valentinianism, after Valentinus
 Wahhabism, after Muhammad ibn Abd-al-Wahhab
 Wycliffite, after John Wycliffe
 Yazidism, after Yazid I
 Zahediyeh, after Zahed Gilani
 Zoroastrianism, after Zoroaster
 Zwingliism, after Huldrych Zwingli

Economic
Georgism, after Henry George
Keynesian economics, after John Maynard Keynes
Malthusianism, after Thomas Robert Malthus

Scientific
Bayesianism, after Thomas Bayes
Comtism, after Auguste Comte
Darwinism, after Charles Darwin
Lamarckism, after Jean-Baptiste Lamarck
Lysenkoism, after Trofim Lysenko

Other
 Flandersism, after Ned Flanders (considered fictional, seen in the animated comedy sitcom The Simpsons)
 Fordism, after Henry Ford
 Freudianism and post-Freudianism, after Sigmund Freud
 Masochism, after Leopold von Sacher-Masoch
 Sadism, after Marquis de Sade
 Social Darwinism, after Charles Darwin
 Taylorism, after Frederick Winslow Taylor
 Victorianism, after Queen Victoria

Notes

 list
Ideologies